Diego Pérez and Francisco Roig were the defending champions, but none competed this year.

Luis Lobo and Javier Sánchez won the title by defeating David Ekerot and László Markovits 6–4, 6–0 in the final.

Seeds

Draw

Draw

References

External links
 Official results archive (ATP)
 Official results archive (ITF)

Croatia Open
1995 ATP Tour